Muhammad Taufiq (born 29 November 1986) is an Indonesian professional footballer who plays as a defensive midfielder for Liga 1 club Persik Kediri.

Personal life
Taufiq hails from Tarakan and is a devout Muslim.

International career 
He made his debut for Indonesia in 2014 FIFA World Cup qualification against Bahrain on 29 February 2012.

Career statistics

International

Honours
Persebaya Surabaya
 Liga Indonesia First Division: 2006
 Liga Primer Indonesia: 2011
 Malaysia-Indonesia Unity Cup: 2011
 Indonesia Premier League runner-up: 2011–12

Persib Bandung
 Indonesia Super League: 2014
 Indonesia President's Cup: 2015

Bali United
 Liga 1: 2019

References

External links
 
 

Living people
1986 births
Indonesian Muslims
People from Tarakan
Indonesian footballers
Liga 1 (Indonesia) players
Indonesian Premier League players
Persebaya Surabaya players
PSIM Yogyakarta players
Persib Bandung players
Bali United F.C. players
Persik Kediri players
Association football midfielders
Indonesian Super League-winning players
Indonesia international footballers
Sportspeople from North Kalimantan